The seventh season of Criminal Minds premiered on CBS in the United States on September 21, 2011. Both A. J. Cook and Paget Brewster were rehired by CBS to reprise their roles as Jennifer Jareau and Emily Prentiss. On February 15, 2012, Deadline Hollywood reported that Paget Brewster (Emily Prentiss) would leave the series, definitively, once season seven was over. All the other main actors on the show secured deals to return for the eighth season. The two-hour season finale, which took place on May 16, 2012, reveals Prentiss making the decision to leave the BAU.

On March 14, 2012, CBS renewed Criminal Minds for an eighth season, which aired on September 26, 2012.

Cast

Main cast 
 Joe Mantegna as Supervisory Special Agent David Rossi (BAU Senior Agent)
 Paget Brewster as Supervisory Special Agent Emily Prentiss (BAU Agent)
 Shemar Moore as Supervisory Special Agent Derek Morgan (BAU Agent)
 Matthew Gray Gubler as Supervisory Special Agent Dr. Spencer Reid (BAU Agent)
 A. J. Cook as Supervisory Special Agent Jennifer "JJ" Jareau (BAU Agent)
 Kirsten Vangsness as Special Agent Penelope Garcia (BAU Technical Analyst & Co-Communications Liaison)
 Thomas Gibson as Supervisory Special Agent Aaron "Hotch" Hotchner (BAU Unit Chief & Co-Communications Liaison)

Recurring cast 
 Bellamy Young as Beth Clemmons
 Jayne Atkinson as Supervisory Special Agent Erin Strauss (BAU Section Chief)
 Cade Owens as Jack Hotchner
 Nicholas Brendon as Kevin Lynch
 Josh Stewart as William "Will" LaMontagne Jr.
 Mekhai Andersen as Henry LaMontagne

Guest stars 

In the season premiere "It Takes a Village", Timothy V. Murphy reprises as Ian Doyle, and Robin Atkin Downes guest-starred as Lachlan McDermott, an international criminal who seeks vengeance against Doyle for murdering his brother Jimmy. In the episode "Proof", Andy Milder guest-starred as Cy Bradstone, a mentally challenged serial killer who removes his victims' five senses with sulfuric acid. Johanna Braddy guest-starred as Cy's niece, Tammy, and Tracy Middendorf guest-starred as Tammy's mother, Lyla, over whom Cy had a secret obsession. In the episode "Dorado Falls", Max Martini guest-starred as Luke Dolan, a former U.S. Navy Seal suffering from posttraumatic stress disorder and capgras syndrome who goes on a murderous rampage. Sarah Aldrich guest-starred as Luke's wife, Jenna.

In the episode "Painless", Eric Jungmann guest-starred as Robert Adams, a survivor of a high school shooting who copied the murders committed by Randy Slade. Julia Campbell guest-starred as Randy's mother, Martha Slade, and Aaron Hill guest-starred as Jerry Holtz, another survivor of the shooting who is murdered by Robert. In the episode "From Childhood's Hour", Isabella Hofmann guest-starred as Carolyn Baker, David Rossi's first wife who dies of amyotrophic lateral sclerosis. Heather Tom guest-starred as Connie Barton, a mother who is abducted by George Kelling. In the episode "There's No Place Like Home", Alex Weed guest-starred as Travis James, a serial killer who abducted male prostitutes.

In the episode "Hope", Brigid Brannagh guest-starred as Monica Kingston, a mother whose daughter was abducted and murdered by Bill Rogers, played by Jack Coleman. In the episode "Self-Fulfilling Prophecy", René Auberjonois of Star Trek: Deep Space 9 fame guest-starred as Colonel Ronald Massey, the leader of the Somerville Military Academy and criminal accomplice of both his second in command and of a dead cadet's vengeful father. In the episode "The Bittersweet Science", Shawn Hatosy guest-starred as Jimmy Hall, a professional boxer and spree killer whose son dies of leukemia. David Mazouz who co-starred with Kieffer Sutherland in the TV show Touch plays young Ryan Hall.  Charles S. Dutton guest-starred as Tony Cole, Jimmy's boxing trainer. Danny Goldman guest-starred as Detective Bob Zablonsky, who leads the investigation of the murders.

In the episode "Unknown Subject", Jay Karnes guest-starred as Hamilton Bartholomew, aka "The Piano Man", a serial rapist who is assaulting the victims he previously raped. In the episode "Snake Eyes", Dean Cain guest-starred as Curtis Banks, a serial killer with a gambling problem. Vanessa Branch guest-starred as Curtis' wife, Teri. In the episode "Closing Time", Geoffrey Blake guest-starred as Michael Janeczko, a serial killer who targeted men who have been divorced, which reflected Michael's own background. Tyler Neitzel guest-starred as Michael's stepson, Hunter Wright. In the episode "A Thin Line", Paul Johansson guest-starred as Clark Preston, a mayoral candidate and criminal accomplice of hate crime serial killer Trevor Mills.

In the episode "A Family Affair", Kathy Baker and William Russ guest-starred as Donald and Linda Collins, the parents of paraplegic serial killer Jeffrey Collins. In the episode "I Love You, Tommy Brown", Teri Polo guest-starred as Margaret Hollman, a mentally unstable high school teacher who fell in love with one of her students, Thomas Brown, with whom she had a son. In the episode "Foundation", Hedy Burress guest-starred as Samantha Allen, the daughter of pedophilic abductor J.B. Allen. In the episode "Heathridge Manor", Juliet Landau guest-starred as Catherine Heathridge, a textile heiress who suffered a psychotic reaction to a Shakespeare play that convinced her that the lead actresses were "The Devil's Wives", prompting her to murder them. Kyle Gallner and Madeleine Martin guest-starred as Catherine's children, James and Lara, who followed in her footsteps. Robert Englund appeared as Detective Gassner, who calls in the BAU for help. 

In the episode "The Company", Shanola Hampton guest-starred as Cindi Burns, Derek Morgan's cousin who suffered from stockholm syndrome after marrying and giving birth to the son of her abductor, Malcolm Ford. In the episode "Divining Rod", Mackenzie Astin guest-starred as Dylan Kohler, the copycat killer of serial killer Rodney Baines Garrett. In the two-part season finale "Hit & Run", Josh Randall guest-starred as Matthew Downs, a member of the Face Cards and Izzy Rogers' lover, and Evan Jones guest-starred as Chris Stratton, another member of the Face Cards. Sebastian Roché reprises as Clyde Easter, Emily Prentiss' former partner at Interpol who offers her a job as Chief of the Interpol office in London, which she accepts, causing her departure from the BAU.

Episodes

Ratings

Home media

References 

General references

External links

Criminal Minds
2011 American television seasons
2012 American television seasons